The Voice Persia is the Persian-language Iranian version of the reality singing competition The Voice, broadcast on MBC Persia.
Filmed in Stockholm, Sweden, the series is aimed at Persian-speaking contestants across the Iranian diaspora, and is judged by Leila Forouhar, Bijan Mortazavi, Sogand Soheili, and Kamyar Ahmadzadeh.

The first season began airing in February 2023 on MBC Persia and was recorded in Stockholm, Sweden a year prior. The season one finale aired on 17 March 2023 with the grand prize of USD 50,000 and a record deal with Platinum Records.

See also 
 Persia's Got Talent
 Stage (Iranian TV series)
 Googoosh Music Academy

References

External links 
 
 
 
 
 

Persia
Persian-language television shows
Television shows filmed in Sweden